Socrate Petteng (born April 23, 1979), better known as Mac Tyer, is a French rapper of Cameroonian descent, from Aubervilliers, Île-de-France. He is also known as Monsieur Socrate or mononym Socrate.

He was also member of Perestroika, a rap/hip hop trio made up of Mac Tyer, Mac Kregor (real name Makenzy Guerrier), also from Aubervilliers, France but of Haitian descent and Dontcha. The band was formed in 1999, and active initially for one year, with very rare appearances later on.

With Dontcha opting to continue on a solo career, Mac Tyer and Mac Kregor turned it into a rap duo renaming it Tandem in 2000. Tandem remained active until 2014, although its members also released solo albums of their own. Tandem was signed at various times to Because Music, Première Classe and Hostile Records.

Discography

Albums
as part of duo Tandem
2005: C'est toujours pour ceux qui savent

Solo

Mixtapes / EPs 
as part of duo Tandem
2001: Ceux qui savent m'ecoutent (EP)
2004: Tandematique Modéle Vol. 1 (Mixtape)
2005: La Trilogie (Maxi)

Solo
2005: Patrimoine du ghetto (produced by Jo Le Balafré)

Singles
Solo

Featured in

Other releases and charted songs
Solo

References

French rappers
French people of Cameroonian descent
Living people
Rappers from Seine-Saint-Denis
Because Music artists
1979 births